The 2000 African Women's Championship was the 4th edition of the biennial African international women's association football tournament organized by CAF and the second to be hosted by a country for the women's national teams of Africa. It was held in South Africa between 11 November and 25 November 2000.

Nigeria won the tournament for the fourth time, beating South Africa in the final 2–0, which was abandoned at the 73rd minute.

Qualification
South Africa as hosts and Nigeria as title holders were qualified automatically, while the remaining six spots were determined by the qualification rounds which took place between June and August 2000.

Format
Qualification was held on a home-and-away two-legged basis. If aggregate scores were tied after the second leg, the away goals rule would apply, even adding the penalty shoot-out if scores were still level. No extra time period was used.

The six winners of the final round qualified for the main tournament.

Preliminary round

|}
Kenya withdrew.

Réunion won by default and qualified for the final round.

Final round

|}
1 Gabon apparently withdrew after the first leg.
2 DR Congo and Sierra Leone withdrew.
First leg in 29–30 July; Second leg in 11–13 August.

Réunion won 5–4 on aggregate and qualified for the final tournament.

Cameroon won by default and qualified for the final tournament.

Morocco won 6–1 on aggregate and qualified for the final tournament.

Zimbabwe won 8–0 on aggregate and qualified for the final tournament.

Ghana won by default and qualified for the final tournament.

Uganda won by default and qualified for the final tournament.

Qualified teams
Réunion, Uganda and Zimbabwe made their first appearances in the tournament. Zimbabwe originally entered this tournament's inaugural edition, but withdrew before playing any match.

Final tournament

Officials
The following referees were named for the tournament:

 Ondo Akono
 Scholastica Tetteh
 Justine Rasoanirina
 Bola Abidoye
 Bolanle Sekiteri
 Fatou Gaye
 Catherine Adipo
 Sabelo Sibindi

Format
The top two teams of each group advance to the semi-finals.

The teams were ranked according to points (3 points for a win, 1 point for a draw, 0 points for a loss).

Squads

Group stage

Group A

Group B

Knockout stage
In the knockout stage, if a match is level at the end of normal playing time, extra time of 30 minutes is played and followed, if necessary, by a penalty shoot-out. No extra time is played in this stage except for the 3rd/4th-place match.

Semi-finals

Third place playoff

Final

1 The match was abandoned in the 73rd minute with Nigeria leading 2–0 after fans started throwing objects at the referee following the second goal, with riot police arriving 40 mins later and firing tear gas in the crowds; fans needed hospital treatment and journalist's cars were attacked as they were leaving the stadium. The result stood as final.

Awards

Statistics

Team statistics

Goalscorers
7 goals

 Mercy Akide

3 goals

 Elizabeth Baidu
 Adjoa Bayor
 Kikelomo Ajayi
 Maureen Mmadu
 Olaitan Yusuf
 Precious Mpala

2 goals

 Mavis Dgajmah
 Rita Nwadike
 Makhosi Luthuli
 Veronica Phewa
 Joanne Solomon
 Nomsa Moyo

1 goal

 Bernadette Anong
 Antoinette Anounga
 Lydienne Eko Njolle
 Desire Enama Abbe
 Memuna Darku
 Gloria Foriwaa
 Nana Gyamfuah
 Sheila Okine
 Alberta Sackey
 Nadia Maqdi
 Stella Mbachu
 Rachelle Lecoutre
 Florence Mussard
 Desiree Ellis
 Hilda Lekalakala
 Martha Malaku
 Oliver Mbekeka
 Alaisa Nakawagi
 Annet Nakimbugwe
 Robina Nakintu
 Thandekile Mathobela
 Yesmore Mutero
 Florence Nyerukai

References

External links
 Tournament chronology and results (including qualification at RSSSF

2000 African Women's Championship